The Transnistrian republic is recognized by three states with limited recognition, and is a member of one international organization, the Community for Democracy and Human Rights, that was established by these four states.

Diplomatic relations

In addition to official diplomatic relations, Transnistria uses specific tools to enact external political relations via public diplomacy. For instance, the Transnistrian President established the state award Order of Friendship (Орден Дружбы) in 2012 to primarily decorate foreigners; it has since then been bestowed upon individual recipients (mainly politicians) from Russia, Abkhazia, South Ossetia, Italy, and the Catholic Church.

See also
 International recognition of Transnistria
 List of diplomatic missions of Transnistria
 List of diplomatic missions in Transnistria
 Political status of Transnistria

Notes

References

External links
 Ministry of Foreign Affairs of Pridnestrovian Moldavian Republic